The Andre Walker Hair Typing System, also known as The Hair Chart is classification system for hair types created in the 1990s by Oprah Winfrey's stylist Andre Walker. It was originally created to market Walker's line of hair care products but has since been widely adopted as a hair type classification system. Walker's system includes images of each hair type to aid classification. The system has been criticised for an apparent hierarchy which values caucasian hair over other hair types. In 2018 the system was the subject of episodes of the podcasts 99% Invisible and The Stoop.

Types 
The system is split into four types with subtypes labeled A, B and C for some of the types, the system has added new subtypes since its original version to Type 1.

See also
Afro-textured hair

References

External links 

 Official website

Human hair
Classification systems